The 1977 U.S. Pro Tennis Championships was a men's tennis tournament played on outdoor green clay courts (Har-Tru) at the Longwood Cricket Club in Chestnut Hill, Massachusetts in the United States. The event was categorized as a 4 Star tournament and was part of the 1977 Grand Prix circuit. It was the 50th edition of the tournament and was held from August 22 through August 30, 1977. Third-seeded Manuel Orantes won the singles title and the accompanying $32,000 first-prize money as well as 125 Grand Prix ranking points. First-seeded Jimmy Connors withdrew after the quarterfinals due to a back injury.

Finals

Singles
 Manuel Orantes defeated  Eddie Dibbs 7–6, 7–5, 6–4
 It was Orantes' 2nd singles title of the year and the 31st of his career.

Doubles
 Bob Lutz /  Stan Smith defeated  Brian Gottfried /  Bob Hewitt 6–3, 6–4

References

External links
 ITF tournament edition details
 Longwood Cricket Club – list of U.S. Pro Champions

U.S. Pro Tennis Championships
U.S. Pro Championships
U.S. Pro Tennis Championships
U.S. Pro Championships
U.S. Pro Championships
Chestnut Hill, Massachusetts
Clay court tennis tournaments
History of Middlesex County, Massachusetts
Sports in Middlesex County, Massachusetts
Tennis tournaments in Massachusetts
Tourist attractions in Middlesex County, Massachusetts